Golden Basket is a 1990 basketball video game developed and published by Opera Soft under their Opera Sports label for the ZX Spectrum, Amstrad CPC, MSX, and DOS.

Gameplay
The game features a five-a-side basketball match, showing a lateral view.

References

External links

Golden Basket at Spectrum Computing

1990 video games
ZX Spectrum games
DOS games
Europe-exclusive video games
MSX games
Amstrad CPC games
Basketball video games
Video games developed in Spain